North Ash Lake and South Ash Lake are a pair of adjacent lakes in Lincoln County, near the city of Ivanhoe in the U.S. state of Minnesota.

The 300-acre Ash Lake Wildlife Management Area is situated along the western shores of the lakes.

Ash Lake was named for the white ash trees near the lake.

See also
List of lakes in Minnesota

References

Lakes of Minnesota
Lakes of Lincoln County, Minnesota